Tara Palm (born 28 July 1985) is an Australian long-distance runner.

In 2009, she competed in the senior women's race at the 2009 IAAF World Cross Country Championships held in Amman, Jordan. She finished in 80th place.

In 2013, she competed in the senior women's race at the 2013 IAAF World Cross Country Championships held in Bydgoszcz, Poland. She finished in 94th place.

In 2019, she won the bronze medal in the women's 5000 metres event at the 2019 Oceania Athletics Championships held in Townsville, Australia. In 2019, she also won the City2Surf event held in Sydney, Australia.

References

External links 
 

Living people
1985 births
Place of birth missing (living people)
Australian female cross country runners
Australian female long-distance runners
21st-century Australian women